Jerzmanowice may refer to the following places in Poland:
Jerzmanowice, Lower Silesian Voivodeship (south-west Poland)
Jerzmanowice, Lesser Poland Voivodeship (south Poland)